McConnell is an Irish and Scottish surname. Notable people with the surname include:

 Aaron McConnell (born 1980), American football player
 Alex McConnell, Scottish footballer
 Allyson McConnell (1978-2013), Australian convicted killer who drowned her two children in Canada
 Brent McConnell, Australian rugby league footballer
 David H. McConnell, founder and president California Perfume Company
 Dorsey W. M. McConnell, bishop of the Episcopal Diocese of Pittsburgh
 Doug McConnell, American television travel host
 Drew McConnell, musician
 Jack McConnell, Scottish politician
 J. C. McConnell, scientific illustrator
 James McConnell, British locomotive engineer
 James McConnell (Medal of Honor), Philippine–American War Medal of Honor recipient
 James Robert McConnell (1915–1999), Irish theoretical physicist, pontifical academician, Monsignor
 James V. McConnell, biologist
 Joe McConnell (1939–2018), American sports announcer
 John McConnell (footballer, born 1881), Scottish footballer
 John McConnell (footballer, born 1885), Scottish footballer
 John H. McConnell, American businessman
 John Michael McConnell, United States Director of National Intelligence
 John P. McConnell (general), (1908–1986) Chief of Staff of the United States Air Force
 John Wilson McConnell (1877–1963), Canadian businessman and major philanthropist
 Joseph C. McConnell (1922–1954), top U.S. fighter ace in the Korean War
 Lee McConnell, Scottish athlete
 Michael W. McConnell, federal judge and legal scholar
 Mike McConnell (radio personality), radio host
 Mitch McConnell (born 1942), United States Senator and Senate Republican Leader, 2007-
 Newton W. McConnell (1832–1915), Chief Justice of the Territorial Montana Supreme Court
 Page McConnell, musician
 Robert McConnell (loyalist), Northern Irish loyalist and alleged Ulster Volunteer Force member
 Rosemary Lowe-McConnell (1921-2014),  English ichthyologist, ecologist, and limnologist 
 Scott McConnell (born 1952), American journalist
 Steve McConnell, software engineer and book author
 T. J. McConnell (born 1992), American basketball player; nephew of Suzie
 T. T. McConnell (1888–1970), American college baseball coach
 Walter McConnell, ceramic artist
 William McConnel, mill and quarry owner
 Kate McConnell, Wolfmother member (2004-2004)

See also
 Suzie McConnell-Serio (born 1966), American basketball player and coach
 McDonnell (surname)

References

Scottish surnames